Rice Creek is a stream in the U.S. state of Minnesota. It is a tributary of the Snake River.

Rice Creek was named for the abundant wild rice near the stream.

See also
List of rivers of Minnesota

References

Rivers of Isanti County, Minnesota
Rivers of Kanabec County, Minnesota
Rivers of Minnesota